Mahabubabad district is a district in the Indian state of Telangana. The district was carved out from the erstwhile Warangal district following the re-organisation of districts in the state in October 2016. The district shares boundaries with Suryapet, Khammam, Bhadradri, Warangal, Mulugu and Jangaon districts.

Geography 

The region is mostly plain with occasional hillocks. Most of the land is used for agriculture. The mandals Bayyaram and Garla have rich iron ore and coal deposits. It also has Bheemunipadam waterfall and Edubavula waterfall. There are several popular hillocks such as Pandavula Guttalu in Bayyaram Mandal (Pandavula Guhalu, Thirumalagiri is different one, located in Jayshankar Bhupalpally district, east of Warangal).

The district is also famous for Kuravi Veerabhadra Swamy temple

Demographics 
 Census of India, the district has a population of 774,549. Percentage of males is 50.10% and 49.9% females. Most of the population lives in villages with 90.14% rural population and 9.86% urban population. Literacy percentage of the district is 57.1% below the state average of 66.5%. The district has significant amount of scheduled tribes population, called Lambadas with about 37.8% whereas scheduled castes are about 13.5%.

Administrative divisions 
The district has two revenue divisions,  Mahabubabad and Thorrur and is sub-divided into 16 mandals.

Mandals 
The district has sixteen mandals .

The following are the list of mandals.

 Mahabubabad
 Kuravi
 Kesamudram
 Dornakal
 Gudur
 Kothaguda
 Gangaram
 Bayyaram
 Garla
 Chinnagudur
 Danthalapalle
 Thorrur
 Nellikudur
 Maripeda
 Narsimhulapet
 Peddavangara

See also 
 List of districts in Telangana

Pictures

References

External links 

Official website

 
Districts of Telangana